John B. Kendrick (1857–1933) was a U.S. Senator from Wyoming from 1917 to 1933. Senator Kendrick may also refer to:

Jeptha J. Kendrick, California State Senate
William H. Kendrick (1822–1901), Florida State Senate